Clark Kent is the secret alter-ego of DC Comics character Superman. 

Clark Kent may also refer to:

Versions of Superman in other media 
 Superman (1978 film series character), the fictional character in the Warner Bros. Superman film series
 Clark Kent (Superman & Lois), the fictional character in the Arrowverse television franchise
 Clark Kent (DC Extended Universe), the fictional character of the DC Extended Universe film series
 Clark Kent (Smallville), the fictional character of the television series Smallville

People with the name Clark Kent or Klark Kent 
 Clark Kent (producer), hip hop producer
 Klark Kent, German graffiti artist and music producer
 Klark Kent, pseudonym under which American musician Stewart Copeland released four singles
 Klark Kent (album), a solo album released under the same pseudonym

Other uses 
 Clark-Kent, a defunct Colorado-based bicycle manufacturer